The Best Male Golfer ESPY Award has been presented annually in two different periods to the  professional male golfer adjudged to be the best in a given calendar year. It was originally presented between 1993 and 2004, but was, along with the parallel Best Female Golfer ESPY Award, subsumed in 2005 by the Best Golfer ESPY Award. The Best Male and Female Golfer Awards returned to the ESPY list in 2009.

Between 1993 and 2004, the award voting panel comprised variously fans; sportswriters and broadcasters, sports executives, and retired sportspersons, termed collectively experts; and ESPN personalities, but balloting thereafter has been exclusively by fans over the Internet from amongst choices selected by the ESPN Select Nominating Committee.

Through the 2001 iteration of the ESPY Awards, ceremonies were conducted in February of each year to honor achievements over the previous calendar year; awards presented thereafter are conferred in July and reflect performance from the June previous. Because of the rescheduling of the ESPY Awards ceremony, the award presented in 2002 was given in consideration of performance betwixt February 2001 and June 2002. The award wasn't awarded in 2020 due to the COVID-19 pandemic.

List of winners

See also
List of golf awards
Best Female Golfer ESPY Award
PGA Player of the Year Award
PGA Tour Player of the Year Award
Byron Nelson Award
Vardon Trophy

References

ESPY Awards
Espy award
Awards established in 1993
Awards disestablished in 2004
Awards established in 2009